The Boston Reds (called the Boston Unions in some sources) of 1884 were a professional baseball team that competed in the short-lived Union Association.

History
One of the last teams to join the Union Association, which operated only for the  season, the Reds were owned by George Wright, whose long association with professional baseball (including the first major-league team in Boston, the Red Stockings) lent sorely-needed credibility to the fledgling league.

The team was managed by Tim Murnane, who was also their regular first baseman.

Their top-hitting regular was outfielder Ed Crane, who batted .285 with 12 home runs, and their best pitcher was Dupee Shaw, who was 21–15 with an ERA of 1.77.  Shaw struck out 18 St. Louis Maroons in a game on July 19.

Ballpark

The club played their home games at the Dartmouth Street Grounds, also known as the Union Athletic Grounds or Union Grounds. A diagram in The Boston Globe on April 3, 1884, around the start of construction, indicated the layout as follows: Huntington Avenue (to the north, some distance back from the main stands and home plate); Boston and Albany Railroad tracks (northeast—home plate and third base); Dartmouth Street (southeast—left and center fields); Boston and Providence Railroad tracks (south—center and right fields); Irvington Street (west, right field and third base—approximately corresponds to Yarmouth Street). Those details match the Sanborn map. The field was to be encircled by a bicycle track, as a number of ballparks were in those days, owing to the growing popularity of cycling. The property once used by the Boston Unions is now occupied by Copley Place.

References

External links
1884 Boston Reds at Baseball-Reference.com
Sanborn map, 1887, showing ballpark
Sanborn map, 1914, showing armory which was built on part of ballpark site

1884 establishments in Massachusetts
1884 disestablishments in Massachusetts
Baseball teams established in 1884
Baseball teams disestablished in 1884
Reds
Defunct baseball teams in Massachusetts
Professional baseball teams in Massachusetts
Union Association baseball teams